Neeyat  ( Intention) is a 1980 Indian Hindi-language romantic action film, produced by Pradeep Sharma and Manoj Kaytee under the Screen Idol Productions banner and directed by Anil Ganguly. It stars Shashi Kapoor, Jeetendra, Rakesh Roshan, Rekha  and music composed by Kalyanji Anandji.

Plot
Vijay (Shashi Kapoor), Jeet (Jeetendra) and Ajay (Rakesh Roshan) are three close friends. Jeet is the son of a rich industrialist Mohanlal Saxena (Pinchoo Kapoor) and is a spoilt boy. Vijay is the brother of a journalist / editor Arvind (Shreeram Lagoo). Jeet is very close to Vijay's family, especially to his sister-in-law (Gita Siddharth). Coincidentally, all of them love the same girl, Rekha (Rekha) at different moments, but Rekha reciprocates only Vijay's love and they both decide to get married. However, Rekha's father (A. K. Hangal), being burdened by an old obligation to Seth Mohanlal, promises Rekha in marriage to Jeet. Seeing this, Vijay and Ajay sideline themselves suppressing their feelings for Rekha. Meanwhile, Mohanlal is not happy with Jeet and Vijay's friendship, so he ensures that Jeet finds out about the love affair between Vijay and Rekha, creating a rift in their friendship. Jeet accuses Vijay of backstabbing him and also breaks his engagement with Rekha.

Now comes another twist in this tale of three friends, Mohanlal Saxena is revealed to be a big-time smuggler who is being investigated by Vijay's brother Arvind, who collects proof against his smuggling activities. Mohanlal kills Arvind with the help of his henchmen Ranjeet (Ranjeet). Inspector Ajay is not able to help Vijay get justice by arresting Mohanlal or Ranjeet due to lack of evidence. On top of that, Ranjeet murders a woman, Mona (Bindu) and implicates Vijay in the murder case. Vijay manages to escape from the Police and begins to hunt for his brother's murderer. Ajay as a police officer is duty-bound to pursue Vijay to arrest him.

Finally, Jeet gets suspicious of his father and makes his own investigations. Finally, the truth is revealed to all the three friends and Jeet sacrifices his life to protect Vijay in the climax.

Cast
Shashi Kapoor as Vijay 
Jeetendra as Jeet
Rakesh Roshan as Ajay
Rekha as Rekha
Shreeram Lagoo as Arvind
Pinchoo Kapoor as Seth Mohanlal Saxena
A. K. Hangal as Rekha's Father
Gita Siddharth
Ranjeet as Ranjeet
Deven Varma
Bindu as Mona

Soundtrack

References

1980s Hindi-language films
Films scored by Kalyanji Anandji
Films directed by Anil Ganguly